Mir Khan Muhammad Jamali   is a Pakistani politician who has been a member of the National Assembly of Pakistan since August 2018.

Political career
He was elected to the National Assembly of Pakistan from Constituency NA-261 (Jafarabad-cum-Sohbatpur) as a candidate of Pakistan Tehreek-e-Insaf in the 2018 Pakistani general election.

Resignation

In April 2022, he also resigned from the National Assembly seat along with all Tehreek-e-Insaaf members after the Foreign-imposed Regime Change by the United States.

External Link

More Reading
 List of members of the 15th National Assembly of Pakistan
 List of Pakistan Tehreek-e-Insaf elected members (2013–2018)
 No-confidence motion against Imran Khan

References

Living people
Pakistani MNAs 2018–2023
Pakistan Tehreek-e-Insaf MNAs
Mir Khan Muhammad
Year of birth missing (living people)